Héctor Jhonny Carabalí Cevallos (born February 15, 1972) is a retired Ecuadorian football midfielder who made 58 appearances for the Ecuador national team between 1992 and 1999.

Club career
At club level Carabalí was part of the Barcelona Sporting Club team that won the Ecuadorian league three times in the 1990s (1991, 1995 & 1997). He has also played for São Paulo in Brazil and a few other Ecuadorian teams.

International career
Carabalí played for Ecuador in the Copa América 1993, 1995, 1997, and 1999.

References

External links

1972 births
Living people
Sportspeople from Guayaquil
Association football midfielders
Ecuadorian footballers
Ecuador international footballers
1993 Copa América players
1995 Copa América players
1997 Copa América players
1999 Copa América players
Barcelona S.C. footballers
São Paulo FC players
S.D. Quito footballers
C.D. Olmedo footballers
Manta F.C. footballers
C.D. ESPOLI footballers
Ecuadorian expatriate footballers
Expatriate footballers in Brazil